Calophyllum persimile is a species of flowering plant in the Calophyllaceae family. It is found in West Papua (Indonesia) and Papua New Guinea.

References

persimile
Flora of Papua New Guinea
Flora of Western New Guinea
Data deficient plants
Taxonomy articles created by Polbot